Space Ship Sappy is a 1957 short subject directed by Jules White starring American slapstick comedy team The Three Stooges (Moe Howard, Larry Fine and Joe Besser). It is the 178th entry in the series released by Columbia Pictures starring the comedians, who released 190 shorts for the studio between 1934 and 1959.

Plot
The Stooges meet up with eccentric Professor A.K. Rimple (Benny Rubin) and his daughter (Doreen Woodbury) who ask the trio to help them with a space mission. The mission lands on the planet Sunev (Venus spelled backwards), where the Stooges are taken in by three attractive female aliens. At first, sparks fly (literally) when the girls kiss the boys, but then the ladies turn cannibalistic and are about to suck the Stooges' blood. However, the boys are able to escape as a huge lizard appears on the horizon, causing the women to run away. The three jump back in the rocket ship, knocking the Professor and his daughter out cold, and fly back to Earth. They are then shown relating the story of their adventure to an assembled group. When they finish, the "Liars Club" presents them with the award for being the biggest liars in the world.

Cast
 Moe Howard as Moe
 Larry Fine as Larry
 Joe Besser as Joe
 Benny Rubin as Professor A. K. Rimple
 Doreen Woodbury as Lisa Rimple
 Lorraine Crawford as Fauna
 Marilyn Hanold as Flora
 Harriette Tarler as 3rd Amazon
 Emil Sitka as Liars Club MC

Production notes
Space Ship Sappy was filmed on August 27–29, 1956.
49-year-old Joe Besser suffered a mild heart attack shortly after filming was completed. Production of the Stooge shorts went on hiatus to allow Besser time to recover. Production eventually resumed on November 19 with Horsing Around.

Space Ship Sappy features Moe and Larry's more "gentlemanly" haircuts, first suggested by Joe Besser. However, these had to be used sparingly, as most of the shorts with Besser were remakes of earlier films, and new footage had to be matched with old. Larry mentions Elvis Presley.

References

External links 
 
 
 Space Ship Sappy at threestooges.net

1957 films
1950s science fiction comedy films
The Three Stooges films
American black-and-white films
American science fiction comedy films
American space adventure films
Films directed by Jules White
Columbia Pictures short films
1957 comedy films
1950s English-language films
1950s American films